Xylopia elliotii is a species of plant in the Annonaceae family. It is found in Ghana and possibly Ivory Coast.

References

elliotii
Vulnerable plants
Flora of Ghana
Taxonomy articles created by Polbot